Colonial elections were held in South Australia on 25 April 1896, excepting the Northern Territory, which voted on 2 May. All 54 seats in the South Australian House of Assembly were up for election. The incumbent liberal government led by Premier of South Australia Charles Kingston in an informal coalition with the United Labor Party (ULP) led by John McPherson defeated the conservative opposition. Each district elected multiple members, with voters casting multiple votes.

Background
The period after the 1893 election saw an increasing competition between the two new political parties – the ULP and the conservative National Defence League (NDL). It also reflected a trend for the conservative members to gravitate to the NDL, and the progressive members to support Kingston, a strong advocate of progressive social policy and reform of the Legislative Council. There was no "Liberal" or "Kingston" party, but there was a relatively cohesive Kingston group among both independent members and candidates. The Liberal and Democratic Union would not be formed until the 1906 election.

The election was held concurrently with the first referendum in Australia.

Women's suffrage in Australia took a leap forward – enacted in 1895 and taking effect from this election, South Australia was the first in Australia and only the second in the world after New Zealand to allow women to vote, and the first in the world to allow women to stand for election. However, the first female would not be elected to the Parliament of South Australia until the 1959 election when Jessie Cooper and Joyce Steele were elected for the Liberal and Country League, and the 1965 election for Labor with Molly Byrne.

Results

See also
Members of the South Australian House of Assembly, 1896–1899
Members of the South Australian Legislative Council, 1897–1900

Notes

References
History of South Australian elections 1857-2006, volume 1: ECSA
Statistical Record of the Legislature 1836-2007: SA Parliament
State and federal election results in Australia since 1890

Elections in South Australia
1896 elections in Australia
1890s in South Australia
April 1896 events